A design brief is a document for a design project developed by a person or team (the designer or design team) in consultation with the client/customer. They outline the deliverables and scope of the project including any products or works (function and aesthetics), timing and budget. They can be used for many projects including those in the fields of architecture, interior design and industrial design. Design briefs are also used to evaluate the effectiveness of a design after it has been produced and during the creation process to keep the project on track and on budget. Some firms rely on them more than others but there is a move towards greater accountability in the design process and therefore many people find them most useful. They usually change over time and are adjusted as the project scope evolves. Often they are signed off by the client and designer at set stages in the project.

A design brief may use the following layout:

 Title page
 Table of contents
  History 
 Company history
 Company Profile
 Specializations
 Designer Profile
 Company Name
 Past Accomplishments
 Problem Statement
 Problem Description
 Constraints
 Budget
 Time
 Needs of the Problem
 Goals
 What you plan to accomplish
 Due dates
 Solution Analysis
 Risks/Benefits
 Planned Solutions
 Sketches
 Synopsis
 Evaluation
 Conclusion/Summary

In the project management frameworks PRINCE2, a project brief is a document established in the startup process of the project and before the project starts, and is used as a foundation for the project initiation documentation.

See also
 Creative brief
 Product design specification, a document that describes design specifications

External links

 Design Brief examples, templates and video guides

Design
Product development